Daddy Day Camp (also known as Daddy Day Care 2) is a 2007 American comedy film starring Cuba Gooding Jr., and directed by Fred Savage in his feature film directorial debut. It is the second installment in the Daddy Day Care film series.

The film was produced by Revolution Studios and released by TriStar Pictures, unlike its predecessor, which was distributed by Columbia Pictures. The film was theatrically released in the United States on August 8, 2007. The film was panned by film critics. It has a 1% rating on Rotten Tomatoes, and is considered to be one of the worst sequels ever produced, but the film was a modest box office success, grossing $18.2 million against a $6 million budget, although it was a ninth of what the first film grossed.

Plot
Four years after starting their daycare and putting Harridan out of business, Charlie and Phil take their kids, Max and Ben, to Camp Driftwood for the summer, a camp they attended as kids back in 1977. But once there, they discover that Driftwood is now completely falling to ruins and also no longer the kindhearted campsite of their time. To save the run-down site, Charlie and Phil buy a partnership from the younger man who ran it when they were children, after the older partner and the original counselor run off on vacation save for bus driver Dale, after spending 30 years running the camp without a vacation.

They run into misadventures along the way when Lance Warner, Charlie's childhood rival, who now runs the luxurious rival camp Canola and has a son named Bobby J (although he denies it), is eager to buy Driftwood just so that he can tear it down. He challenges Driftwood to the upcoming Camp Olympiad, but Charlie refuses, saying he wants nothing more to do with it after losing to Lance when they were kids. The first day of camp turns out to be a disaster involving a skunk caused by Max and a bathroom explosion when Phil dropped a match in the bathroom while doing his business when the light in the bathroom went out.

As a result, most of the parents pull their kids from the camp and request refunds, but Charlie and Phil have already spent all the money on repairs, leaving Driftwood with only 7 campers instead of the original 35, and in need of help to improve their financial situation. Initially reluctant, Charlie eventually calls his military father, Colonel Buck Hinton, for help to whip the kids into shape since they have problems following orders. The next day, Driftwood is raided by Canola, which has been joined by the 28 campers who left Driftwood, and they steal the Driftwood flag. Buck arrives and starts training the campers easily until Canola raids them once again and teases Buck: that's when Buck chooses to get back on Lance and help Driftwood get the flag back, which they do and succeed.

Lance shows up and taunts Charlie over his teaching style when he remembers him from the Olympiad they competed in when they were kids and Charlie responds by accepting the challenge to the Camp Olympiad, so the kids start training for it. As they train, the kids admire Buck because of his military ways and support, but Charlie disapproves as he recounts that he doesn't want the kids to become like Buck because Charlie believes that Buck has always only cared about toughness and that Charlie was a disappointment to him. Charlie starts to regret his decision to call Buck when his son runs off to the woods after Lance and some of his fellow campmates tease him about his father's over-protectiveness because his grandpa Buck told him that he became 'tough' when he ran off to the woods. They manage to find Ben, but then when Charlie complains to Phil about Buck, Buck overhears their conversation and leaves camp.

On the day of the Olympiad, the others find out that Buck has left. Seeing all the kids discouraged, Charlie goes to find Buck and bring him back, resolving all his problems with his dad in the process. When they return, the kids report that they found out that Camp Canola has cheated in the Olympiad; this is especially possible when it's revealed that Lance won the 1977 Olympiad. Buck formulates a plan to win against Canola by outsmarting them. After outmatching the Canola dweebs through to the finals, Driftwood is all set for the baton relay: with Mullet Head doing the climbing course and Max doing the sprint - against Bobby J. of Canola. However, Mullet Head injures his ankle from falling in the three-legged race (or so it appears) so Charlie lets Ben do the climbing course instead, as Ben also knows how to climb by instinct, but he falls. However, his campmates encourage him to keep going and Becca even shows everyone that Lance greased the wall, corroborating the truth that Lance cheated in every game in the Olympiad to everyone including Charlie, and had in fact been doing so for years. Therefore, Ben uses the tree next to the wall with enough time left to hit the bell, thus finally giving Driftwood the win for a change and proving himself to his father.

Lance reprimands his son for costing their camp the entire competition; insulted and fed up with Lance constantly denying being his father, Bobby J turns against Lance by talking back and angrily kicking him, making Lance stumble backward into the wall's supports and causing the wall to collapse on top of a trophy case, smashing them instantly and subsequently causing Lance to break down crying. With Driftwood's victory in the bag, all of the parents who pulled their kids from Driftwood and even those who sent their kids to Canola originally, tell Charlie and Phil that Driftwood might set the best example for their kids after all and request permission to send their kids there, thus saving it from foreclosure. The movie ends with Buck and Charlie reconciling after all these years apart and the current Driftwood campers heading to get the trophy for their first Olympiad.

Cast
 Cuba Gooding Jr. as Charlie Hinton, the co-owner of Daddy Day Camp and teacher. He was played by Eddie Murphy in the original film.
 Lochlyn Munro as Lance Warner, Charlie's childhood enemy, and the arrogant and hypocritical owner of the rival camp Canola.
 Richard Gant as Col. Buck Hinton, Charlie's estranged father. He is a military officer who takes army tasks very seriously, but he displays a soft spot for his grandson, Ben, as well as the other campers.
 Paul Rae as Phil Ryerson, co-owner of Daddy Day Camp, Charlie's best friend. He was played by Jeff Garlin in the original film.
 Tamala Jones as Kim Hinton, Charlie's wife.
 Josh McLerran as Dale, an oafish young counselor at Camp Driftwood and the driver for the camp's bus. He is a replacement for the character "Marvin", who was played by Steve Zahn in the original film.
 Spencir Bridges as Ben Hinton, Charlie's son, Becca and Max's best friend, and a student at Daddy Day Camp.
 Brian Doyle-Murray as "Uncle" Morty, former owner of Camp Driftwood.
 Dallin Boyce as Max Ryerson, Phil's son and Becca and Ben's best friend and a student at Daddy Day Camp.
 Telise Galanis as Juliette, one of the campers whom Robert likes. 
 Molly Jepson as Becca, a smart girl, Max and Ben's best friend, and a student at Daddy Day Camp.
 Sean Patrick Flaherty as Robert "Bobby" Jefferson Warner, Lance's bratty, brainless and equally arrogant son, whom he denies having since he hates kids.
 Taggart Hurtubise as Carl, the more independent six-year-old brother of Robert.
 Tad D'Agostino as Robert, a shy, nerdy, and socially awkward boy who falls for Juliette.
 Tyger Rawlings as Billy, a heavyweight bully, who likes to make other people bleed.
 Talon G. Ackerman as Jack Mayhoffer, a nerdy boy (and presumably, the youngest of all the campers). He has a very weak stomach and vomits easily.
 Zachary Allen as Mullet Head, a rebellious but athletic boy with a mullet hairdo.
 Jennifer Lyon as Mrs. Simmons

Production

In August 2003, soon after the release of Daddy Day Care, Murphy was lured into making a sequel, although he hadn't signed up for the film.

From August 23–October 4, 2006, Daddy Day Camp was set and filmed in Park City, and Provo, Utah.
This film was originally produced as a direct-to-DVD release (which is why this had a much lower budget than its predecessor). Sony changed their minds, and the film was given a theatrical release because test screenings for the film went extremely well.

Reception

Box office
Daddy Day Camp grossed $13.2 million in the United States and Canada, and $4.9 million in other territories, for a worldwide total of $18.2 million.

On opening day Daddy Day Camp grossed $773,706, and grossed $3,402,678 on opening weekend on over 2,000 screens, coming in 9th place. It went on to gross $18.2 million worldwide making it a modest box office success.

Critical response
On Rotten Tomatoes the film holds an approval rating of 1% based on 79 reviews, with an average rating of 2.28/10. The website's critical consensus reads: "A mirthless, fairly desperate family film, Daddy Day Camp relies too heavily on bodily functions for comedic effect, resulting in plenty of cheap gags, but no laughs". On Metacritic, the film has a weighted average score of 13 out of 100, based on 19 critics, indicating "overwhelming dislike".

Audiences polled by CinemaScore gave the film an average grade of "B" on an A+ to F scale. Nathan Rabin from The A.V. Club gave the film a rare "F" grade.

Accolades

Home media

Daddy Day Camp was released on DVD in Region 1 in the United States on January 29, 2008, and also Region 2 in the United Kingdom on 18 February. It was distributed by Sony Pictures Home Entertainment.

References

External links

 
 
 

2007 films
2007 comedy films
American comedy films
American sequel films
Davis Entertainment films
Films directed by Fred Savage
Films shot in Utah
Revolution Studios films
Films produced by John Davis
Films scored by James Dooley
Films with screenplays by Joel Cohen
Films with screenplays by Alec Sokolow
Films about summer camps
TriStar Pictures films
2007 directorial debut films
Golden Raspberry Award winning films
2000s English-language films
2000s American films